The Air Force–Hawaii football rivalry is an American college football rivalry between the Air Force Falcons and the Hawaii Rainbow Warriors.

History
The Kuter Trophy is awarded to the winner of the game. The trophy is named after General Laurence S. Kuter, who was appointed the first head of the Pacific Air Forces Command (located at Hickam Air Force Base in Honolulu) in 1957. The two teams have met 22 times, with Air Force leading the series 14–7–1.

Game results

See also 
 List of NCAA college football rivalry games

References

College football rivalries in the United States
Air Force Falcons football
Hawaii Rainbow Warriors football